Digrammia rippertaria, the northern granite, is a species of geometrid moth in the family Geometridae. It is found in Europe and Northern Asia (excluding China) and North America.

The MONA or Hodges number for Digrammia rippertaria is 6394.

Subspecies
These two subspecies belong to the species Digrammia rippertaria:
 Digrammia rippertaria flavularia (Püngeler, 1902)
 Digrammia rippertaria rippertaria (Duponchel in Godart & Duponchel, 1830)

References

Further reading

External links

 

Macariini
Articles created by Qbugbot
Moths described in 1830